Midlands 103 (previously known as Midlands Radio 3) is an Irish local independent radio station broadcasting to counties Laois, Offaly, and Westmeath.

The station's offices and main broadcast studios are in Tullamore, County Offaly. It also has studios in Athlone Towncentre Shopping Centre, Athlone and the Bridge Shopping Centre, Tullamore, and a studio and office in Harbour Place Shopping Centre, Mullingar, with programmes being broadcast regularly from all of these. Midlands 103 also has two outside broadcast units.

As of the end of 2021, Midlands 103 had a weekly reach of 122,000 listeners with 73,000 tuning in daily, according to Joint National Listenership Research survey figures.

History 
The station was established as "Radio 3" in 1990 having operated as an unlicenced broadcaster "Radio West" between 1982 and 1988.

Station output 

The prime-time weekday schedule includes breakfast programming, a daily current affairs magazine show, music-driven programmes in the afternoon and "drive time" programming until 7pm.

The weekend schedule is a mixture of music programmes and sports coverage, which sometimes includes full commentary of local and inter-county Gaelic games. Ireland's longest running love songs show, "Twilight Time", is broadcast on Sunday nights.

News 
The newsroom is staffed by two full-time newsreaders and a sports correspondent. Midlands 103 also uses its own reporters and freelancers to cover events across the broadcast area. A sports reporter and commentators provide sports updates. The station produces its own local news bulletins for the region during peak times, with evening and weekend network bulletins produced by Bauer Media Audio Ireland.

Sales and promotion 
Midlands 103 has 4 full time sales people covering the station's FM broadcast area, a classified sales person and business development officer. The station is also a part of the group of independent stations affiliated with the IRS+ national media sales and marketing bureau, which provides national and international branded advertising.

Midlands 103 runs two annual awards ceremonies: the "Hospitality Awards" (which gives awards to pubs/bars, hotels, restaurants and the tourism sector), and the "Customer Service Awards" (which focus on customer service in retail and other business in the area).

References

External links
 
 Midlands 103 Awards website

Radio stations in the Republic of Ireland
Mass media in County Offaly